George Butler may refer to:

Arts and entertainment
 George Butler (filmmaker) (1944–2021), American filmmaker
 George Butler (record producer) (1931–2008), American record producer
 George Bernard Butler (1838–1907), American painter
 George Edmund Butler (1872–1936), English landscape and portrait painter
 George "Wild Child" Butler (1936–2005), American blues musician

Education
 George Butler (1819–1890), English divine and schoolmaster
 George Butler (headmaster) (1774–1853), English schoolmaster and churchman, also his son (1819–1890)

Law and politics
 George Edwin Butler (1868–1941), American lawyer and author
 George Howland Butler (1894–1967), United States Ambassador to the Dominican Republic
 George Slade Butler (1821–1882), English lawyer and antiquary
 Geoffrey G. Butler (1887–1929), British Member of Parliament for Cambridge University, 1923–1929

Military
 George D. Butler (1813–1836), Alamo defender
 George Harris Butler (1840–1886), U.S. Army officer and U.S. counsel general to Egypt
 George Lee Butler (born 1939), Commander in Chief Strategic Air Command

Sports
 George Butler (cricketer, born 1810) (1810–1887), English cricketer
 George Butler (cricketer, born 1900) (1900–1969), English cricketer

Other
 George Butler, 5th Marquess of Ormonde (1890–1949)
 George Butler (bishop), bishop of Limerick
 George Henry Butler, American businessman
 George Ide Butler (1834–1918), Seventh-day Adventist leader